Šķirotava is a neighbourhood of Riga, the capital of Latvia. It is located in the Latgale Suburb of Riga close to the city's southeastern border. The perfect way to get there is by Rīgas Satiksme companies buses: N3, N13, N15, N20, N34, N47, N48, N50, N52 or trolleybuses N16 and N22. The neighborhood is serviced by Šķirotava station.

References

Sources 

Neighbourhoods in Riga